Balawadi is a village located in Khanapur (Vita) Taluka, Sangli District of Maharashtra, India.

Places Near
Vita
Bhood
Khanapur (Vita)

References 

Villages in Sangli district